Bank (also Romanized as Banak) is a city in the Central District of Kangan County, Bushehr province, Iran. At the 2006 census, its population was 8,753 in 1,751 households. The following census in 2011 counted 11,515 people in 2,737 households. The latest census in 2016 showed a population of 14,126 people in 3,807 households.

References 

Cities in Bushehr Province
Populated places in Kangan County